Royal Central College - Polonnaruwa (also known as Royal College - Polonnaruwa or Polonnaruwa Rajakeeya Madya Maha Vidyalaya) is a national school in Polonnaruwa, Sri Lanka.

History

Royal Central College was founded by government minister C. P. de Silva on the lines of the Royal College, Colombo. Silva laid the foundation stone of the school on 19 April 1959. Six years later the school was opened for local children. Scholarships were offered to students in Polonnaruwa and Trincomalee districts. The main objective of the school was to give proper educational opportunities for the children of farmers. The school also owned  of land and paddy fields and the income from these was used to fund the school. At the beginning students were recruited to grade 9 and upwards. Students were selected for art, commerce, and science classes by scholarship examination in grade 8. D. B. Karunathilaka was the school's first principal and R. W. Galahitiyawa was the vice principal. The school had around 22 staff in 1965.

The school was closed in 1971 due to the JVP insurrection. It became a rehabilitation camp. No education was carried out at the school for three years. Instead, commerce classes were held in the irrigation office and science classes was held at Topawewa School.

Notable alumni

Below is a list of notable alumni of Royal Central College, Polonnaruwa

See also
 List of schools in North Central Province, Sri Lanka

References

External links

 

Boarding schools in Sri Lanka
Educational institutions established in 1959
National schools in Sri Lanka
Schools in Polonnaruwa District
Internment camps in Sri Lanka
1959 establishments in Ceylon